Hans Ludwig Kurt Reinhold Grüß (4 March 1929 – 24 November 2001) was a German musicologist and ensemble leader.

Life

Childhood and studies 
He spent his childhood and adolescence in Freiberg since his father taught as professor of mathematics and technical mechanics at the Bergakademie Freiberg from 1936. As a grammar school student he was drafted to the Volkssturm and was only able to take his Abitur after he had been a prisoner of war.

First he studied German language and literature, musicology and pedagogy at the Humboldt University of Berlin from 1947, and from 1949 at the Leipzig University and the Musikhochschule. Early on, he became interested in performance practice of early music and received his doctorate in 1956 with a work on Josquin des Prez.

Professional activity 
In 1957 Grüß was given a lectureship at the University of Leipzig. Because of political disagreements he was threatened with the withdrawal of his teaching license by the SED in 1963. It was only after the political change in 1993 that he was appointed extraordinary professor and taught until 1996. As a sought-after specialist, he continued to hold lectureships at the Technical University of Dresden and at the Leipzig Academy of Music after his retirement.

Ensemble leader 
In 1957 he founded the Capella Fidicinia, an ensemble consisting of members of the Leipzig Institute for Musicology, which was dedicated to the faithful performance of early music. They played on historical instruments of the Museum of Musical Instruments of Leipzig University, whereby Grüß played the viol.
For larger performances Grüß and his ensemble regularly received support from musicians of the Gewandhausorchester and the MDR Leipzig Radio Symphony Orchestra. A particularly close collaboration existed with the Dresdner Kreuzchor and the soloists Winfried Schrammek (organ), Peter Schreier and Martin Krumbiegel, who has led the ensemble since the death of its founder.

Grüß died in Much at the age of 72.

Honours 
 Ehrennadel der Karl-Marx-Universität Leipzig, 1984
 Kunstpreis der Stadt Leipzig, 1985
 Ordinary member of the Sächsische Akademie der Wissenschaften, 1995

Literature 
 Hans Grüß: Ansichtssachen, Verlag Kamprad, Altenburg 1999. 
 Winfried Schrammek: Magister und Musicus. Hans Grüß zum Gedenken, Leipzig 2005.

Recordings 
Ockeghem/Obrecht "Missa L'Homme armé" Capella Fidicinia, Thomanerchor Leipzig, Hans Grüß querstand

References

External links 
 
 Hans Grüß im Professorenkatalog der Universität Leipzig
 Mitglieder der Sächsischen Akademie der Wissenschaften
 Capella Fidicinia
 

20th-century German musicologists
Musicologists from Berlin
German conductors (music)
Academic staff of the University of Music and Theatre Leipzig
Academic staff of TU Dresden
1929 births
2001 deaths
Volkssturm personnel
German prisoners of war in World War II
Child soldiers in World War II